Iwaki Province may refer to:
 Iwaki Province (718) (岩城国), an old province of Japan established in 718 and dissolved by 724
 Iwaki Province (1868) (磐城国), an old province of Japan established in 1868